Muller Dinda (born 22 September 1995) is a Gabonese footballer who plays for Omani club Sohar SC and the Gabon national team. He competed at the 2012 Summer Olympics.

Honours

Club
Mangasport
 Gabon Championnat National D1: 2015

References

External links
 
 

1995 births
Living people
Gabonese footballers
Olympic footballers of Gabon
Footballers at the 2012 Summer Olympics
Association football defenders
Association football midfielders
Gabon international footballers
Gabon youth international footballers
AS Mangasport players
Widad Témara players
Raja CA players
Sohar SC players
Gabon Championnat National D1 players
Botola players
Oman Professional League players
Gabonese expatriate footballers
Gabonese expatriate sportspeople in Morocco
Gabonese expatriate sportspeople in Oman
Expatriate footballers in Morocco
Expatriate footballers in Oman
People from Moanda
Missile FC players
USM Libreville players
21st-century Gabonese people